Crush Songs is the debut solo studio album by Yeah Yeah Yeahs lead vocalist Karen O. It was released on September 5, 2014, by Cult Records. "Rapt" was released as the album's lead single on July 29, 2014.

Background and recording
The songs were written at a time of emotional discomfort for Karen O. "When I was 27 I crushed a lot. I wasn't sure I'd ever fall in love again. These songs were written + recorded in private around this time. They are the soundtrack to what was an ever continuing love crusade", she explained in a statement posted on her website.

Commercial performance
Crush Songs debuted at number 61 on the UK Albums Chart with first-week sales of 1,336 copies.

Track listing

Personnel
Credits adapted from the liner notes of Crush Songs.

 Karen O – vocals, all other drawings, recording
 Dean Fertita – backing vocals 
 Julian Gross – design
 Bernie Grundman – mastering
 Yong Kok Kim – young Karen portrait
 Nick Launay – mixing
 Jack Lawrence – backing vocals 
 Imaad Wasif – guitar

Charts

Release history

References

2014 debut albums
Cult Records albums
Karen O albums